KP: The Autobiography is the autobiography of England cricketer Kevin Pietersen, ghost written by Irish sports journalist David Walsh. It was scheduled to be released on 9 October 2014. The book will summarise incidents from Pietersen's early life in South Africa and his career with the England team, including his sacking from the England squad in February 2014.

References

External links
KP: The Autobiography on Amazon

2014 non-fiction books
Cricket books
Sports autobiographies
British autobiographies
Sphere Books books